Salford City Stadium (referred to as the AJ Bell Stadium for sponsorship purposes) is a rugby stadium in Barton-upon-Irwell, England, built to replace Salford rugby league club's ground the Willows for the 2012 season. Sale Sharks rugby union club have also played at the stadium since the 2012–13 season.

Development and financing 
In 2005, Salford City Council approved plans for the Reds to move from the Willows to the brownfield site at Barton.

The stadium was originally to be developed by Red City Developments, with construction to be complete for the start of the 2009 season. However, RCD went into administration in July 2008.

Salford City Council formed a joint venture company with Peel Group to develop and deliver the £16 million stadium, which is part of the a £26 million development close to the Manchester Ship Canal and the M60 motorway.

Planning permission was granted in March 2010 for a 15,000-capacity stadium.

Sale Sharks confirmed their move to the stadium in April 2012, signing a 25-year lease.

In 2013, Peel Group and Salford City Council each lent £600,000 in emergency funding to the stadium. The council is still owed £20 million for building the stadium, and is already owed £1.5m by the Salford City Reds who play at the stadium.

In 2014, SCC and Peel lent a further £410,724 to the stadium.

AJ Bell Stadium
On 13 September 2013, it was announced that investment platform AJ Bell had secured a nine-year stadium naming rights partnership with Sale Sharks Rugby Club. The deal saw Salford City Stadium re-branded and renamed AJ Bell Stadium.

Facilities
The stadium capacity (since inception} has accommodated a crowd of 12,000. However, with further construction, the space exists to expand the capacity to 20,000 spectators.. The stadium has areas designated for standing supporters. This partial-standing design is similar to the Halliwell Jones Stadium, home of Warrington RLFC.

There are four stands:
West Stand (main stand) including changing rooms, media centre, hospitality boxes, banqueting suite; capacity 4,500
Places2Be Stand (North) – all-standing, usually the away end; capacity 2,500
Printerland.co.uk Stand (East) - all seating, capacity 2,500
AO Stand  (South/THE SHED)– all-standing, home to hardcore Reds fans; identical to the North Stand, capacity 2,500

The seats in the West and East Stands are red (for Salford) and blue (for Sale).

The development also includes offices, player facilities, concessions, community resources and two community outdoor sport pitches, a gym and the Sale Sharks Club Shop.

Events

Rugby league
The Reds played their first league game at the new stadium against Castleford on 4 February 2012; Castleford won 10–24.

The 2012 Challenge Cup Semi Final was held at the stadium on 15 July 2012 – Warrington beat Huddersfield 33–6.

The 2012 Autumn International Series Final took place at the stadium on 11 November 2012, attendance was 7,921.

On 7 November 2013 the stadium hosted the Rugby League World Cup match between Scotland and USA. A crowd of 6,041 watched Scotland beat the USA 22 – 8.

Summary

List of test and International tournament matches played at AJ Bell Stadium since its opening in 2012.

Rugby union
Sale Sharks' first game at the stadium was a friendly on 24 August 2012 against Leinster Rugby, which ended 10–10. Their first competitive game was against Saracens on 8 September 2012. The score was Sale 16–23 Saracens and the attendance was 7,451.

The stadium served as one of the two venues for the 2016 World Rugby Under 20 Championship.  England beat Ireland 45-21 in the final at the stadium.

Other sports

American football
BAFA National Leagues side Manchester Titans held a trial game at the Stadium against Crewe Railroaders on 1 June 2014. It was stated that they could hold future fixtures inside the stadium if the trial was successful. The Titans beat the Railroaders 69–0 and the attendance was 1,349.

Association football
For the 2013–14 season, Manchester United have announced their under-21 team will be playing all their home games at the stadium.

The stadium also hosted England women's Euro 2013 qualifying match against the Netherlands on 17 June 2012.

Attendances

Notes

References

External links

 AJ Bell Stadium official website
 Salford City Reds get new Barton stadium go-ahead BBC Sport, 19 August 2010
 2012 – The Future of History Salford City Reds

Sports venues in Salford
Salford Red Devils
Rugby union stadiums in England
Rugby league stadiums in England
Rugby League World Cup stadiums
The Peel Group
Sale Sharks
American football venues in the United Kingdom
Ship canals